Belarus competed at the 2020 Winter Youth Olympics in Lausanne, Switzerland from 9 to 22 January 2020.

Medalists

Alpine skiing

Boys

Biathlon

Boys

Girls

Mixed

Cross-country skiing 

Boys

Girls

Ice hockey

Mixed NOC 3x3 tournament 

Boys
Danil Karpovich
Ilya Korzun
Andrei Murashko
Yan Shostak

Speed skating

Boys

Girls

Mass Start

Mixed

See also
Belarus at the 2020 Summer Olympics

References

Nations at the 2020 Winter Youth Olympics
Belarus at the Youth Olympics